Johan Tobias Sergel (7 September 1740 in Stockholm – 26 February 1814 in Stockholm) was a Swedish neoclassical sculptor. Sergels torg, the largest square in the centre of Stockholm and near where his workshop stood, is named after him.

Life

Johan Tobias Sergel was born in Stockholm in 1740. He was the son of the decorator, Christoffer Sergel and Elisabet (née Swyrner), and was the brother of the decorator, Anna Brita Sergel. His first teacher was Pierre Hubert Larchevêsque. After studying in Paris, he went to Rome. He stayed in Rome for twelve years and sculpted a number of groups in marble. Besides subjects from classical mythology such as the Diomedes Stealing the Palladium, which he sold to the British collector, Thomas Mansel Talbot, in 1772, he also sculpted a colossal representation of The Muse of History Recording the Deeds of Gustavus Adolphus, in which are depicted the achievements of King Gustav II Adolf before the Chancellor, Axel Oxenstierna. It was in Rome also that he modelled the statue of King Gustav III, subsequently cast in bronze and purchased by the city of Stockholm in 1796. While primarily a sculptor, Sergel (inspired by English artists like Thomas Rowlandson) also drew sequential picture stories, an early form of comic strip.

Summoned by Gustav III, Sergel returned to Stockholm in 1779 and continued to work there. Among the monuments he created at this time are a tomb for Gustav Vasa, a monument to Descartes, and a large relief in the church of St. Clarens, representing the Resurrection. He was an important part of the artistic elite in Stockholm, drawing a portrait of Sweden's bard Carl Michael Bellman among others. He had a relationship with the celebrated actress Fredrique Löwen and was possibly the father of one of her children. He died in his native city on 26 February 1814.

Works
Among his works in the Nationalmuseum in Blasieholmen, central Stockholm are his monumental sculptures "Diomedes Stealing the Palladium", "The Muse of History Recording the Deeds of Gustavus Adolphus", and a "Bust of Gustavus III".

References

Sources

Attribution

External links

Johan Tobias Sergel at Lambiek artists archive.

Swedish male sculptors
Neoclassical sculptors
1740 births
1814 deaths
Age of Liberty people
Gustavian era people
Swedish cartoonists
Artists from Stockholm
18th-century sculptors
18th-century Swedish artists
18th-century Swedish male artists
19th-century Swedish sculptors
19th-century Swedish male artists